Paul Edward Popovich (born August 18, 1940) is a former American professional baseball infielder. He played in Major League Baseball from 1964 through 1975 for the Chicago Cubs, Los Angeles Dodgers, and Pittsburgh Pirates.

Early years
The Flemington, West Virginia native also played independent baseball on the Morgantown, West Virginia American Legion team. He signed as an amateur free agent with the Chicago Cubs for $40,000 in 1960.

He batted .313 with seventeen home runs and sixty RBIs.

Chicago Cubs
He made his major league debut in the fifth game of the  season, and got a pinch hit single in his only at bat. In two games, he went 0-for-6.

Following his brief stint with the Cubs in 1966, Popovich spent the Winter with the Arizona Instructional League Cubs learning shortstop and third base. In 49 games, Popovich batted .214 with no home runs, two RBIs and eighteen runs scored. Following the season, he and minor leaguer Jim Williams were traded to the Los Angeles Dodgers for outfielder Lou Johnson.

Los Angeles Dodgers
His first major league home run was a game tying ninth inning blast against the Philadelphia Phillies on June 9. He also had a four hit game against the Houston Astros on May 24. All told, Popovich batted .232 with two home runs and 25 RBIs. Shortly into the  season, the Dodgers traded Popovich and Ron Fairly to the Montreal Expos for Dodgers legend Maury Wills and Manny Mota. The Expos then flipped Popovich back to the Cubs for Jack Lamabe and Adolfo Phillips.

Chicago Cubs
He earned the nickname "Supersub" for his utility work for the Cubs in 1969. He also had a career high .312 batting average, as the Cubs battled the New York Mets for the National League East crown. He remained a supersub for the Cubs through the  season. While he batted a meager .217, he had a career high 28 RBIs, and tied his career high from the previous season with four home runs.

Pittsburgh Pirates
Just as the  season was getting underway, Popovich was traded to the Pittsburgh Pirates for pitcher Tom Dettore. He reached the post season for the only time in his career against his former club, the Los Angeles Dodgers. While the Pirates lost to the Dodgers, three games to one, Popovich had an exceptional series. He went 3-for-5 with a run scored. He was released midway through the  season.

Career statistics

The 1969 Dodgers yearbook shows Popovich surrounded by 21 fans who shared his surname.

References

1940 births
American men's basketball players
Arizona Instructional League Dodgers players
Living people
Major League Baseball second basemen
Major League Baseball shortstops
Chicago Cubs players
Los Angeles Dodgers players
Pittsburgh Pirates players
Baseball players from West Virginia
West Virginia Mountaineers baseball players
West Virginia Mountaineers men's basketball players
American people of Serbian descent
San Antonio Missions players
Wenatchee Chiefs players
Amarillo Gold Sox players
Salt Lake City Bees players
Arizona Instructional League Cubs players
Tacoma Cubs players
People from Taylor County, West Virginia